Grajaú is a neighborhood in the North Zone of Rio de Janeiro, Brazil. The neighborhood has tree-lined and quiet streets, made up of upper and middle-class residences, some of which were built in the early twentieth century and preserve some of their original features, although sharing the landscape with some buildings from more recent decades. 

Although it is essentially residential, Grajaú has some commercial establishments to serve the local market, and has several schools, among which stands out a traditional Catholic educational institution, the Colégio da Companhia de Maria.

The main avenue of Grajaú is Engenheiro Richard Avenue, a tribute to the founder of the neighborhood, Antônio Eugênio Richard Júnior, a banker, industrialist and one of the most influential men of the first decades of the 20th century. This avenue is divided in the middle by a flowerbed of tamarind trees, where the current headquarters of the Grajaú Tennis Club is located.

The neighborhood is intersected by important roads such as Rua Barão de Mesquita, Avenida Menezes Cortes (also known as Grajaú-Jacarepaguá highway) and Rua Barão do Bom Retiro, connecting Grajaú to the Méier region.

The center of Grajaú is located in Largo do Verdun, where the main commercial establishments are located, and in Praça Edmundo Rego, where the Byzantine-Styled Nossa Senhora do Perpétuo Socorro Church is located.

History 

The neighborhood was named after the Grajaú River, which runs through the state of Maranhão. The river was named after the indigenous Grajaú people, who inhabited the area before the arrival of the Portuguese.

During the 1960s and 1970s, Grajau experienced significant growth and development, with the construction of several apartment buildings and the expansion of the road network. Today, the neighborhood is home to a diverse population, including families, young professionals, and students.

Transportation 

Grajau is served by several bus lines, which provide connections to other neighborhoods in the North Zone and the city center. The neighborhood is also located near the Engenho Novo train station, which provides access to the suburban rail network.

In recent years, Grajau has also become more bike-friendly, with the construction of several bike lanes and the implementation of a bike-sharing program.

Neighbourhoods in Rio de Janeiro (city)